Asawari Joshi (born 6 May 1965) is an Indian actress. She has acted in many Marathi language films and serials. She is known for her role in the Hindi TV series, Office Office. She has acted as Lovely Kapoor in film Om Shanti Om. She is also known for her role in the Hindi serial Shake iT Up aired on Disney Channel, which is the Indian version of American show Shake It Up.

Politics
Asawari Joshi joined Congress Party in 2021. One year later, she joined Nationalist Congress Party (NCP) in April 2022.

Filmography

Films

Television

References

External links
 

1965 births
Living people
Actresses in Marathi cinema
Actresses in Hindi television
Indian film actresses
Indian television actresses